Dysgonia senex is a moth of the family Noctuidae first described by Francis Walker in 1858. It is found in the Australian state of Queensland.

The wingspan is about 70 mm.

References

External links

Dysgonia